Patterson is an unincorporated community in Caldwell County, North Carolina, United States. Patterson has a post office with ZIP code 28661.

Clover Hill was listed on the National Register of Historic Places in 1973.

References

Unincorporated communities in Caldwell County, North Carolina
Unincorporated communities in North Carolina